Attosecond chronoscopy are measurement techniques for attosecond-scale delays of atomic and molecular single photon processes like photoemission and photoionization. Ionization-delay measurements in atomic targets provide a wealth of information about the timing of the photoelectric effect, resonances, electron correlations and transport.

Attosecond chronoscopy deals with the time resolved observation of ultrafast electronic processes of quantum physics of matter with applications to atoms, molecules and solids. Typical time scales covered range from attoseconds (10−18 sec.) to femtoseconds (10−15 sec.). Realtime observations of such processes has become possible since the turn of the millennium when well-controlled subfemtosecond laser pulses became available. Chronoscopy can provide  information complementary to that accessible through conventional spectroscopy. While spectroscopy aims at characterizing processes through measurements with the highest possible energy resolution but without time resolution, chronoscopy attempts to capture dynamical aspects of quantum dynamics through high time resolution but with only limited energy resolution. Important applications are non-stationary and decaying states, quantum transport and charge migration, irreversible processes (the "Arrow of time") and the loss of phase information called decoherence of a quantum system due to its interaction with the environment.

Bibliography

See also

 Attophysics

Time-resolved spectroscopy
Atomic physics
Molecular physics